This article describes the knockout stage of the 2018–19 EHF Champions League.

Qualified teams
The top six placed teams from each of the two groups advanced to the knockout stage.

Format
12 teams played home and away in the first knock-out phase, with the 10 teams qualified from groups A and B and the two teams qualified from groups C and D. After that, the six winners of these matches in the first knock-out phase joined with the winners of groups A and B to play home and away for the right to play in the final four.

Round of 16

Overview

|}

Matches

Telekom Veszprém won 65–57 on aggregate.

MOL-Pick Szeged won 45–36 on aggregate.

RK Vardar won 59–48 on aggregate.

Flensburg-Handewitt won 60–48 on aggregate.

PGE Vive Kielce won 67–62 on aggregate.

HBC Nantes won 62–61 on aggregate.

Quarterfinals

Overview

|}

Matches

Barcelona Lassa won 61–51 on aggregate.

PGE Vive Kielce won 60–59 on aggregate.

Telekom Veszprém won 57–47 on aggregate.

RK Vardar won 56–52 on aggregate.

Final four
The final four was held at the Lanxess Arena in Cologne, Germany on 1 and 2 June 2019. The draw took place on 7 May 2019.

Bracket

Semifinals

Third place game

Final

References

knockout stage